Sulaimanius is a genus of adapiform primate that lived in Asia during the late early Eocene. The genus was originally named Sulaimania, but was renamed in 2012 by the original authors to use the masculine form, Sulaimanius, to avoid a conflict with a genus of spider.

References

Literature cited

 

Prehistoric strepsirrhines
Eocene primates
Eocene mammals of Asia
Prehistoric primate genera
Fossil taxa described in 2012